Cyproheptadine, sold under the brand name Periactin among others, is a first-generation antihistamine with additional anticholinergic, antiserotonergic, and local anesthetic properties.

It was patented in 1959 and came into medical use in 1961.

Medical uses

Cyproheptadine is used to treat allergic reactions (specifically hay fever). The evidence for its use for this purpose indicates its effectiveness but second generation antihistamines such as ketotifen and loratadine have shown equal results with fewer side effects.

It is also used as a preventive treatment against migraine. In a 2013 study the frequency of migraine was dramatically reduced in patients within 7 to 10 days after starting treatment. The average frequency of migraine attacks in these patients before administration was 8.7 times per month, this was decreased to 3.1 times per month at 3 months after the start of treatment. This use is on the label in the UK and some other countries.

It is also used off-label in the treatment of cyclical vomiting syndrome in infants; the only evidence for this use comes from retrospective studies.

Cyproheptadine is sometimes used off-label to improve akathisia in people on antipsychotic medications.

It is used off-label to treat various dermatological conditions, including psychogenic itch  drug-induced hyperhidrosis (excessive sweating), and prevention of blister formation for some people with epidermolysis bullosa simplex.

One of the effects of the drug is increased appetite and weight gain, which has led to its use (off-label in the USA) for this purpose in children who are wasting as well as people with cystic fibrosis.

It is also used off-label in the management of moderate to severe cases of serotonin syndrome, a complex of symptoms associated with the use of serotonergic drugs, such as selective serotonin reuptake inhibitors (and monoamine oxidase inhibitors), and in cases of high levels of serotonin in the blood resulting from a serotonin-producing carcinoid tumor.

Cyproheptadine has sedative effects and can be used to treat insomnia similarly to other centrally-acting antihistamines. The recommended dose for this use is 4 to 8 mg.

Adverse effects
Adverse effects include:

 Sedation and sleepiness (often transient)
 Dizziness
 Disturbed coordination
 Confusion
 Restlessness
 Excitation
 Nervousness
 Tremor
 Irritability
 Insomnia
 Paresthesias
 Neuritis
 Convulsions
 Euphoria
 Hallucinations
 Hysteria
 Faintness
 Allergic manifestation of rash and edema
 Diaphoresis
 Urticaria
 Photosensitivity
 Acute labyrinthitis
 Diplopia (seeing double)
 Vertigo
 Tinnitus
 Hypotension (low blood pressure)
 Palpitation
 Extrasystoles
 Anaphylactic shock
 Hemolytic anemia
 Blood dyscrasias such as leukopenia, agranulocytosis and thrombocytopenia
 Cholestasis
 Hepatic (liver) side effects such as:
 Hepatitis
 Jaundice
 Liver failure
 Hepatic function abnormality
 Epigastric distress
 Anorexia
 Nausea
 Vomiting
 Diarrhea
 Anticholinergic side effects such as:
 Blurred vision
 Constipation
 Xerostomia (dry mouth)
 Tachycardia (high heart rate)
 Urinary retention
 Difficulty passing urine
 Nasal congestion
 Nasal or throat dryness
 Urinary frequency
 Early menses
 Thickening of bronchial secretions
 Tightness of chest and wheezing
 Fatigue
 Chills
 Headache
 Increased appetite
 Weight gain

Overdose
Gastric decontamination measures such as activated charcoal are sometimes recommended in cases of overdose. The symptoms are usually indicative of CNS depression (or conversely CNS stimulation in some) and excess anticholinergic side effects. The LD50 in mice is 123 mg/kg and 295 mg/kg in rats.

Pharmacology

Pharmacodynamics

Cyproheptadine is a very potent antihistamine or inverse agonist of the H1 receptor. At higher concentrations, it also has anticholinergic, antiserotonergic, and antidopaminergic activities. Of the serotonin receptors, it is an especially potent antagonist of the 5-HT2 receptors. This is thought to underlie its effectiveness in the treatment of serotonin syndrome. However, it is possible that blockade of 5-HT1 receptors may also contribute to its effectiveness in serotonin syndrome. Cyproheptadine has been reported to block 85% of 5-HT2 receptors in the human brain at a dose of 4 mg three times per day (12 mg/day total) and to block 95% of 5-HT2 receptors in the human brain at a dose of 6 mg three times per day (18 mg/day total) as measured with positron emission tomography (PET). The dose of cyproheptadine recommended to ensure blockade of the 5-HT2 receptors for serotonin syndrome is 20 to 30 mg. Besides its activity at neurotransmitter targets, cyproheptadine has been reported to possess weak antiandrogenic activity.

Pharmacokinetics
Cyproheptadine is well-absorbed following oral ingestion, with peak plasma levels occurring after 1 to 3 hours. Its terminal half-life when taken orally is approximately 8 hours.

Chemistry
Cyproheptadine is a tricyclic benzocycloheptene and is closely related to pizotifen and ketotifen as well as to tricyclic antidepressants.

Research
Cyproheptadine was studied in one small trial as an adjunct in people with schizophrenia whose condition was stable and were on other medication; while attention and verbal fluency appeared to be improved, the study was too small to draw generalizations from.  It has also been studied as an adjuvant in two other trials in people with schizophrenia, around fifty people overall, and did not appear to have an effect.

There have been some trials to see if cyproheptadine could reduce sexual dysfunction caused by SSRI  and antipsychotic medications.

Cyproheptadine has been studied for the treatment of posttraumatic stress disorder.

Veterinary use
Cyproheptadine is used in cats as an appetite stimulant and as an adjunct in the treatment of asthma. Possible adverse effects include excitement and aggressive behavior.  The elimination half-life of cyproheptadine in cats is 12 hours.

Cyproheptadine is a second line treatment for pituitary pars intermedia dysfunction in horses.

References 

Antiandrogens
Antihistamines
Antipsychotics
Appetite stimulants
Dibenzocycloheptenes
Dopamine antagonists
Local anesthetics
Muscarinic antagonists
Piperidines
5-HT2 antagonists
Serotonin receptor antagonists
Sodium channel blockers